Fontegreca is a comune (municipality) in the Province of Caserta in the Italian region Campania, located about  north of Naples and about  northwest of Caserta.

Fontegreca borders the following municipalities: Capriati a Volturno, Ciorlano, Gallo Matese, Prata Sannita.

References

Cities and towns in Campania